USS Shadow III (SP-102) was an armed motorboat that served in the United States Navy as a patrol vessel from 1917 to 1919.
 
Shadow III was built as a civilian motorboat in 1916 by the Purdy Boat Company, at Miami, Florida. The U.S. Navy purchased Shadow III from Purdy on 12 June 1917 for use as a patrol boat during World War I. She was commissioned on 4 September 1917 as USS Shadow III (SP-102).

Shadow III patrolled the Florida coast off Miami during World War I. After the war, she acted as an aircraft crash boat for Naval Air Station Miami, Florida.

Shadow III was decommissioned at Miami on 25 January 1919. The Navy delivered her to the Parris Island Marine Corps Base at Parris Island, South Carolina, on 1 August 1919 for further non-commissioned service.

In December 1919, Shadow III was taken to the Charleston Navy Yard at Charleston, South Carolina, for survey. She was sold on 5 August 1921 to Mike Letiff of Charleston.

See also
Crash boats of World War 2

References

Department of the Navy Naval Historical Center Online Library of Selected Images: U.S. Navy Ships: USS Shadow III (SP-102), 1917-1921. Originally the Civilian Motor Boat Shadow III
NavSource Online: Section Patrol Craft Photo Archive: Shadow III (SP 102)

Patrol vessels of the United States Navy
World War I patrol vessels of the United States
Ships built in Miami
1916 ships